Ryan McBean (born April 22, 1984) is a former American football defensive end. He was drafted by the Pittsburgh Steelers in the fourth round of the 2007 NFL Draft. He played college football at Oklahoma State.

McBean also played for the Denver Broncos, Baltimore Ravens and Arizona Cardinals.

Early years
McBean graduated from Trinity High School (Euless, Texas) in 2003. There he earned first-team All-District honors after his senior season, Ryan was named the District Defensive Most Valuable Player, and received first-team All-District, The First Team Of the Decade, and All-Area honors from the Dallas Morning News.

College career
McBean played at Hinds Community College in Mississippi for the 2003 and 2004 seasons before transferring to play college football at Oklahoma State in 2005 and 2006.

Professional career

Pittsburgh Steelers
McBean was selected by the Pittsburgh Steelers in the fourth round (132nd overall) in the 2007 NFL Draft. He made one appearance in his rookie season, and was cut from the team prior to the 2008 season.

Denver Broncos
McBean was signed to the practice squad of the Denver Broncos on September 1, 2008.  He became a starter at the defensive end position for the 2009-2010 season under coach Josh McDaniels.

In March 2012, he was suspended for six games after failing a drug test.

Baltimore Ravens
McBean signed with the Baltimore Ravens on May 7, 2012.

Arizona Cardinals
McBean signed with the Arizona Cardinals on August 20, 2014. The Cardinals released McBean on August 27, 2014.

References

External links
Denver Broncos bio
Oklahoma State Cowboys bio

1984 births
Living people
People from Euless, Texas
Jamaican players of American football
American football defensive tackles
American football defensive ends
Hinds Eagles football players
Oklahoma State Cowboys football players
Pittsburgh Steelers players
Denver Broncos players
Baltimore Ravens players
Arizona Cardinals players
Sportspeople from Kingston, Jamaica